The 2020 Conference USA Football Championship Game was a college football game played on Friday, December 18, 2020, to determine the 2020 champion of Conference USA (C–USA). The game featured the East division champions Marshall Thundering Herd and the West division champions UAB Blazers in the conference's 16th championship game. Sponsored by tax services and consulting firm Ryan LLC, the game was officially known as the Ryan Conference USA Football Championship Game.

Previous season
The 2019 Conference USA Football Championship Game featured the East Division champion Florida Atlantic against the West Division champion UAB. The Owls defeated the Blazers by a score of 49–6.

Teams
The 2020 Conference USA Football Championship Game was contested by the Marshall Thundering Herd, East Division champions, and the UAB Blazers, West Division champions. The teams had met 10 times previously, with the Thundering Herd holding a 8–2 edge in the series. The teams' last meeting was played in 2014; Marshall won, 23–18. The game was the teams' first meeting between the two in the Conference USA Football Championship Game.

Marshall

Marshall clinched its spot in the championship game on December 9 following the cancelation, due to the COVID-19 pandemic, of their final scheduled game against Charlotte. The cancelation of the game prevented Marshall from winning the division outright on the field; however, according to Conference USA's special tie-breaking criteria for the season, Marshall would win the title even if Florida Atlantic won their final game and had a higher winning percentage in conference games. The need for a tie-breaker was rendered moot when Florida Atlantic lost their final game to Southern Miss on December 10, confirming the Thundering Herd's position in the title game. This was the Thundering Herd's third appearance in the conference title game and first since 2014.

UAB

UAB clinched its spot to represent the west division in the championship game on December 12, after defeating Rice, 21–16. The Blazers won their third straight division title and became the first team in the conference to play in three consecutive conference championship games.

Game summary

Statistics

References

External links
 Game statistics at statbroadcast.com

Championship
Conference USA Football Championship Game
Marshall Thundering Herd football games
UAB Blazers football games
Conference USA Football Championship Game
Conference USA